Fatawa-e-Razvia or Fatawa-e-Radaviyyah is a major compilation of fatwas and journals for the Hanafi Fiqh authored by 19th century Sunni Islamic scholar Ahmed Raza Khan.

The Fatawa-e-Razvia was discussed by Arun Shourie in his  book, The World of Fatwas or the Sharia in Action 
Its 12 volumes were first published by Ahmed Raza Khan's brother at Hasani press, and only two volumes of various Fatawa's were published during the lifetime of the author. Later published by Raza Foundation Lahore in 30 Volumes. Raza Academy was first to publish its various volumes in 1985.

Books and Journals 
It contains books and journals on legal rulings (fatawa) based on questions asked by scholars and general public in the domain of Hanafi fiqh covering a wide variety of different topics and beliefs. 

Some of the books and journals included in Fatawa Razawiyya:

Book of Purification (كتاب الطهارة) 
This part focuses on cleanliness and ritual purification under Hanafi fiqh and contains around 239 fatawa. It has around 29 Journals which are: 
 Awareness that the fatawa are based on the opinion of the Imam. (اجلى الاعلام ان الفتوى مطلقاعلى قول الإمام)
 Pillars of ablution (الجود الخلوفئ أركان الوضوء)
 Using cloth for drying after ablution (تنويزالقنديل فئ أوضاف المنديل)
 Mucus dripping doesn't invalidate the ablution (لمع الاحكام ان لاوضوءمن الزكام)
 Rulings under which blood invalidates the ablution (الطرازالمعلم فيماهوحدث من احوال الدم)
 Which type of sleep invalides the ablution (نبه القوم ان الوضوء من اى نوم)
 Summary of issues faced in ablution (خلاصه تبيان الوضو)
 Ruling and causes of nocturnal emission (الاحكام والعلل فى اشكال الاحتلام والبلل)
 Amount of water in ablution (بارق النورفي مقاديرماءالطهور)
 Unnecessarily spending water in ablution (بركات السماء في حكم اسراف الماء)
 Various forms for Qur'an recitation by a junub (ارتفاع الحجب عن وجوه قراءة الجنب)
 Definition of used water (الطرس المعدل في حدالماءالمستعمل)
 Difference between received and poured water (النميقة الانقى في فرق الملاقي والملقى)
 Survey on spherical (round) water (الهنيئ النميرفىالماءالمستدير)
 Expanding the field of waters whose surface and depth are not equal (رحب الساحة في مياه لايستوى وجهها وجوفهافى المساحة)
 How much depth is needed in an excessive amount of water (هبةالحبيرفى عمق ماءكثير)
 Orders related to pure water (النوروالنورق لاسفارالماءالمطلق)
 Regarding the water bought by a child, a gift by Prophet (صَلَّى ٱللّٰهُ عَلَيْهِ وَسَلَّمَ) ( عطاءالنبى صَلَّى ٱللّٰهُ عَلَيْهِ وَسَلَّمَ لافاضةاحكام ماءالصبى )
 Explanation of water flow (الدقةوالتبيانلعلم الرقة والسيلان)
 The best description and definition of tayammum (حسن التعقم لبيان حدالتيمم)
 Conditions of shortage of water (سمح الندرىفيمايورث العجز عن الماء)
 Statement of Imam Zafar regarding the tayammum (الظفرلقول زفر)
 Definition of earthen for tayammum (المطرالسعيدعلى نبت جنس الصعيد)
 Conditions for not reusing earthen for tayammum (الجدالشديدفىنفى الاستعمال عن الصعيد)
 Explanation of the quote of Sadr al-Shari'a about tayammum  (الطلبةالبديعةفيقول صدرالشريعة)
 Guide for problems faced by junub (مجلى الشمعةلجامع حدث ولمعة)
 Ruling about dog and its hunt (سلب الثلب عن القائلين بطهارة الكلب)
 The ruling of sugar being cleaned from animal bones (الاحلى من السكرلطلبةسكرروسر)
 Explanation of the difference between the ruling of bones and wine (وضع ضابطه کلیهدریںبابوتفرقه درحکم عظام وشراب)

Book of Prayer (كتاب الصلوة) 
This part focuses on the prayer under Hanafi fiqh and contains around 1203 fatawa in around 23 journals:

 Book of prayer (كتاب الصلوة)
 Pearls of the crown, in the statement of prayer before the night journey  (جمان التاج في بيان الصلاة قبل المعراج)
 Is it allowed to offer two prayers jointly (حاجز البحرين الواقى عن جمع الصلاتين)
 Improvement of eyesight due to the kissing of thumbs  (منيرالعين في حكم تقبيل الابهامين)
 Ruling of thumbs during iqama (نهج السلامة في حكم تقبيل الابهامين في الاقامة)
 Ruling on the justification for calling adhan on the grave after burial  (ايذان الاجرفی اذانه القبر)
 Determining the correct direction of Qiblah (هدايةالمتعال فى حدالاستقبال)
 Explanation of place of articulation of Ḍād (ﺽ) (نعم الزادلروم الضاد)
 Correct Pronunciation of Ḍād (ﺽ) (الجام الضاد عن سنن الضاد)
 It is extremely prohibited to pray behind the rejectors of taqlid (النهي الاكيد عن الصلاة وراء عدى التقليد)
 Four Answers (القلادة المرضعة في نخر الأجوبة الأربعة)'
 For those who accept the second congregational prayer (القطوف الدانية لمن أحسن الجماعة الثانية)
 Imam's correct qiyam in Mihrab (تيجان الصواب في قيام الامام في المحراب)
 Refutation of a fatawa about Qanoot e Nazila (اجتناب العمال عن فتاوى الجهال)
 Blessings of Salat il Asrar, research of Salat ul Ghosia  (انهارالانوارمن يم صلوة الاسراره)
 Method of Salat ul Ghosia (ازهارالانوارمن صباصلوة الاسرار)
 Reciting the blessed Bismillah in Tarawih (وصاف الرجيح في بسملة التراويح)
 The courtyard of the mosque is part of the mosque (التبصير المنجد بان صحن المسجد مسجد)
 Researching if its allowed for the imam to leave minbar to greet the ruler (مرقاة الجمان في الهبوط عن المنبرلمدح السلطان)
 Ruling for dua between khutbah of Friday prayer  (رعاية المذهبين في الدعاء بين الخطبتين)
 Ruling for second Adhan for Friday prayer  (اوفى اللمعةفىاذان يوم الجمعة)
 Ruling for dua after eid prayers (سرورالعيد السعيدفى حل الدعاء بعدصلوة العيد)
 Proofs of embracing muslim brothers after eid prayers (وشاخ الجيد في تحليل معانقة العيد)

Book of Funeral Prayer (کتاب الجنائز) 
This part focuses on the islaimc funeral prayer under Hanafi fiqh and contains around 273 fatawa in around 13 journals:

 Discussion about permissibility of writing prayers on the shroud of the dead (الحرف الحسن في الكتابة على الكفن)

See also
 List of Sunni books
 Fatawa-e-Alamgiri
 Husamul Haramain

References

External links
 

Sunni literature
Fatwas
Barelvi literature
Works of Ahmed Raza Khan Barelvi
20th-century Indian books
Indian non-fiction books
Indian religious texts
Islamic studies books
Islamic literature